Harry G. Snyder (born February 11, 1938) is an American lawyer and retired judge.  He served on the Wisconsin Court of Appeals in the Waukesha-based District II from 1991 until his retirement in 2010.  Earlier in his career, he served six years in the Wisconsin State Assembly and eleven years as a Wisconsin Circuit Court Judge in Waukesha County.

Biography
Snyder was born on February 11, 1938, in Davenport, Iowa. He graduated from Oconomowoc High School in Oconomowoc, Wisconsin, and attended Ripon College, the University of Wisconsin-Madison and Marquette University Law School.

Career
Snyder served in the Judge Advocate General's Corps as an officer in the United States Air Force and Air Force Reserve. During this time, he was named a NATO Trial Observer by the United States Ambassador to Turkey while stationed at Incirlik Air Base. After returning to the United States, Snyder served as Assistant District Attorney of Waukesha County from 1968 to 1969. He was elected to the Assembly in 1974 and re-elected in 1976, 1978, and 1980. He resigned from the Assembly a month after winning re-election in 1980 to accept appointment to the Wisconsin Circuit Court from Governor Lee S. Dreyfus.  He remained on the Circuit Court until his appointment to the Court of Appeals in 1991. Judge Snyder retired in 2010.

References

Politicians from Davenport, Iowa
People from Oconomowoc, Wisconsin
Members of the Wisconsin State Assembly
Wisconsin Court of Appeals judges
Wisconsin lawyers
Military personnel from Wisconsin
United States Air Force officers
Ripon College (Wisconsin) alumni
University of Wisconsin–Madison alumni
Marquette University Law School alumni
1938 births
Living people
Military personnel from Iowa